Fisherwick is a civil parish in Lichfield District, Staffordshire, England. The ancient settlement, dating back to the 12th century, and the manor of Fisherwick Park no longer exist. The parish council is a joint one with Whittington.

See also
Listed buildings in Fisherwick
Baron Fisherwick

References

External links
 
 Whittington and Fisherwick Parish Council Website

Civil parishes in Staffordshire